Memorias (Memories) is a studio album released by the romantic ensemble Grupo Bryndis.

Track list

CD track list

DVD track list
Amor Prohibido "Poemas" [DVD] 
Vas a Sufrir [DVD]     
Mi Verdadero Amor [DVD]     
Por Estar Pensando en Ti [DVD]     
Se Marchó [DVD]     
Las Vías del Amor [DVD]     
Niña Mujer [DVD]     
Me Quedé Queriéndote [DVD]     
Te Juro Que Te Amo [DVD]     
Tu Forma de Ser [DVD]

References

Grupo Bryndis albums
2003 albums
Disa Records albums